The Holy See, also called the See of Rome, Petrine See or Apostolic See, is the jurisdiction of the Pope in his role as the bishop of Rome. It includes the apostolic episcopal see of the Diocese of Rome, which has ecclesiastical jurisdiction over the Catholic Church and sovereignty over the city-state known as the Vatican City.

According to Catholic tradition, it was founded in the first century by Saints Peter and Paul and, by virtue of the doctrines of Petrine and papal primacy, is the focal point of full communion for Catholic Christians around the world. As a sovereign entity, the Holy See is headquartered in, operates from, and exercises "exclusive dominion" over the independent Vatican City State enclave in Rome, of which the pope is sovereign.

The Holy See is administered by the Roman Curia (Latin for "Roman Court"), which is the central government of the Catholic Church. The Roman Curia includes various dicasteries, comparable to ministries and executive departments, with the Cardinal Secretary of State as its chief administrator. Papal elections are carried out by part of the College of Cardinals.

Although the Holy See is sometimes metonymically referred to as the "Vatican", the Vatican City State was distinctively established with the Lateran Treaty of 1929, between the Holy See and Italy, to ensure the temporal, diplomatic, and spiritual independence of the papacy. As such, papal nuncios, who are papal diplomats to states and international organizations, are recognized as representing the Holy See and not the Vatican City State, as prescribed in the Canon law of the Catholic Church. The Holy See is thus viewed as the central government of the Catholic Church. The Catholic Church, in turn, is the largest non-government provider of education and health care in the world.

The Holy See maintains bilateral diplomatic relations with 183 sovereign states, signs concordats and treaties, and performs multilateral diplomacy with multiple intergovernmental organizations, including the United Nations and its agencies, the Council of Europe, the European Communities, the Organization for Security and Co-operation in Europe, and the Organization of American States.

Terminology 

The word "see" comes from the Latin word sedes, meaning 'seat', which refers to the episcopal throne (cathedra). The term "Apostolic See" can refer to any see founded by one of the Twelve Apostles, but, when used with the definite article, it is used in the Catholic Church to refer specifically to the see of the Bishop of Rome, whom that Church sees as the successor of Saint Peter. While Saint Peter's Basilica in Vatican City is perhaps the church most associated with the papacy, the actual cathedral of the Holy See is the Archbasilica of Saint John Lateran in the city of Rome.

In the Roman Catholic Church, only the see of the pope bears the right to be addressed symbolically as "holy". However, there was one exception to this rule, represented by the Bishopric of Mainz. During the Holy Roman Empire, the former Archbishopric of Mainz (which was also of electoral and primatial rank) had the privilege to bear the title of "the Holy See of Mainz" (Latin: Sancta Sedes Moguntina).

History 

According to Catholic tradition, the apostolic see of Diocese of Rome was established in the 1st century by Saint Peter and Saint Paul, then the capital of the Roman Empire . The legal status of the Catholic Church and its property was recognised by the Edict of Milan in 313 by Roman emperor Constantine the Great, and it became the state church of the Roman Empire by the Edict of Thessalonica in 380 by Emperor Theodosius I.

After the fall of the Western Roman Empire in 476, the temporal legal jurisdisction of the papal primacy was further recognised as promulgated in Canon law. The Holy See was granted territory in Duchy of Rome by the Donation of Sutri in 728 of King Liutprand of the Lombards, and sovereignty by the Donation of Pepin in 756 by King Pepin of the Franks.

The Papal States thus held extensive territory and armed forces in 756–1870. Pope Leo III crowned Charlemagne as Roman Emperor by translatio imperii in 800. The pope's temporal power peaked around the time of the papal coronations of the emperors of the Holy Roman Empire from 858, and the Dictatus papae in 1075, which conversely also described Papal deposing power. Several modern states still trace their own sovereignty to recognition in medieval papal bulls.

The sovereignty of the Holy See was retained despite multiple sacks of Rome during the Early Middle Ages. Yet, relations with the Kingdom of Italy and the Holy Roman Empire were at times strained, reaching from the Diploma Ottonianum and Libellus de imperatoria potestate in urbe Roma regarding the "Patrimony of Saint Peter" in the 10th century, to the Investiture Controversy in 1076–1122, and settled again by the Concordat of Worms in 1122. The exiled Avignon Papacy during 1309–1376 also put a strain on the papacy, which however finally returned to Rome. Pope Innocent X was critical of the Peace of Westphalia in 1648 as it weakened the authority of the Holy See throughout much of Europe. Following the French Revolution, the Papal States were briefly occupied as the "Roman Republic" from 1798 to 1799 as a sister republic of the First French Empire under Napoleon, before their territory was reestablished.

Notwithstanding, the Holy See was represented in and identified as a "permanent subject of general customary international law vis-à-vis all states" in the Congress of Vienna (1814–1815). The Papal States were recognised under the rule of the Papacy and largely restored to their former extent. Despite the Capture of Rome in 1870 by the Kingdom of Italy and the Roman Question during the Savoyard era (which made the pope a "prisoner in the Vatican" from 1870 to 1929), its international legal subject was "constituted by the ongoing reciprocity of diplomatic relationships" that not only were maintained but multiplied.

The Lateran Treaty on 11 February 1929 between the Holy See and Italy recognised Vatican City as an independent city-state, along with extraterritorial properties around the region. Since then, Vatican City is distinct from yet under "full ownership, exclusive dominion, and sovereign authority and jurisdiction" of the Holy See.

Organization

The Holy See is one of the last remaining seven absolute monarchies in the world, along with Saudi Arabia, Eswatini, United Arab Emirates, Qatar, Brunei and Oman. The pope governs the Catholic Church through the Roman Curia. The Curia consists of a complex of offices that administer church affairs at the highest level, including the Secretariat of State, nine Congregations, three Tribunals, eleven Pontifical Councils, and seven Pontifical Commissions. The Secretariat of State, under the Cardinal Secretary of State, directs and coordinates the Curia. The incumbent, Cardinal Pietro Parolin, is the See's equivalent of a prime minister. Archbishop Paul Gallagher, Secretary of the Section for Relations with States of the Secretariat of State, acts as the Holy See's minister of foreign affairs. Parolin was named in his role by Pope Francis on 31 August 2013.

The Secretariat of State is the only body of the Curia that is situated within Vatican City. The others are in buildings in different parts of Rome that have extraterritorial rights similar to those of embassies.

Among the most active of the major Curial institutions are the Congregation for the Doctrine of the Faith, which oversees the Catholic Church's doctrine; the Congregation for Bishops, which coordinates the appointment of bishops worldwide; the Congregation for the Evangelization of Peoples, which oversees all missionary activities; and the Pontifical Council for Justice and Peace, which deals with international peace and social issues.

Three tribunals exercise judicial power. The Roman Rota handles normal judicial appeals, the most numerous being those that concern alleged nullity of marriage. The Apostolic Signatura is the supreme appellate and administrative court concerning decisions even of the Roman Rota and administrative decisions of ecclesiastical superiors (bishops and superiors of religious institutes), such as closing a parish or removing someone from office. It also oversees the work of other ecclesiastical tribunals at all levels. The Apostolic Penitentiary deals not with external judgments or decrees, but with matters of conscience, granting absolutions from censures, dispensations, commutations, validations, condonations, and other favors; it also grants indulgences.

The Prefecture for the Economic Affairs of the Holy See coordinates the finances of the Holy See departments and supervises the administration of all offices, whatever be their degree of autonomy, that manage these finances. The most important of these is the Administration of the Patrimony of the Apostolic See.

The Prefecture of the Papal Household is responsible for the organization of the papal household, audiences, and ceremonies (apart from the strictly liturgical part). 

One of Pope Francis's goals is to reorganize the Curia to prioritize its role in the Church's mission to evangelize. This reform insists that the Curia is not meant to be a centralized bureaucracy, but rather a service for the pope and diocesan bishops that is in communication with local bishops' conferences. Likewise more lay people are to be involved in the workings of the dicasteries and in giving them input.

The Holy See does not dissolve upon a pope's death or resignation. It instead operates under a different set of laws sede vacante. During this interregnum, the heads of the dicasteries of the Curia (such as the prefects of congregations) cease immediately to hold office, the only exceptions being the Major Penitentiary, who continues his important role regarding absolutions and dispensations, and the Camerlengo of the Holy Roman Church, who administers the temporalities (i.e., properties and finances) of the See of St. Peter during this period. The government of the See, and therefore of the Catholic Church, then falls to the College of Cardinals. Canon law prohibits the College and the Camerlengo from introducing any innovations or novelties in the government of the Church during this period.

In 2001, the Holy See had a revenue of 422.098 billion Italian lire (about US$202 million at the time), and a net income of 17.720 billion Italian lire (about US$8 million). According to an article by David Leigh in the Guardian newspaper, a 2012 report from the Council of Europe identified the value of a section of the Vatican's property assets as an amount in excess of €680m (£570m); as of January 2013, Paolo Mennini, a papal official in Rome, manages this portion of the Holy See's assets—consisting of British investments, other European holdings and a currency trading arm. The Guardian newspaper described Mennini and his role in the following manner: "... Paolo Mennini, who is in effect the pope's merchant banker. Mennini heads a special unit inside the Vatican called the extraordinary division of APSA – Amministrazione del Patrimonio della Sede Apostolica – which handles the 'patrimony of the Holy See'."

The orders, decorations, and medals of the Holy See are conferred by the pope as temporal sovereign and fons honorum of the Holy See, similar to the orders awarded by other heads of state.

Status in international law

The Holy See has been recognized, both in state practice and in the writing of modern legal scholars, as a subject of public international law, with rights and duties analogous to those of States. Although the Holy See, as distinct from the Vatican City State, does not fulfill the long-established criteria in international law of statehood—having a permanent population, a defined territory, a stable government, and the capacity to enter into relations with other states—its possession of full legal personality in international law is shown by the fact that it maintains diplomatic relations with 180 states, that it is a member-state in various intergovernmental international organizations, and that it is: "respected by the international community of sovereign States and treated as a subject of international law having the capacity to engage in diplomatic relations and to enter into binding agreements with one, several, or many states under international law that are largely geared to establish and preserving peace in the world."

Diplomacy 

Since medieval times the episcopal see of Rome has been recognized as a sovereign entity. The Holy See (not the State of Vatican City) maintains formal diplomatic relations with and for the most recent establishment of diplomatic relations with  sovereign states, and also with the European Union, and the Sovereign Military Order of Malta, as well as having relations of a special character with the Palestine Liberation Organization; 69 of the diplomatic missions accredited to the Holy See are situated in Rome. The Holy See maintains 180 permanent diplomatic missions abroad, of which 74 are non-residential, so that many of its 106 concrete missions are accredited to two or more countries or international organizations. The diplomatic activities of the Holy See are directed by the Secretariat of State (headed by the Cardinal Secretary of State), through the Section for Relations with States. There are 13 internationally recognized states with which the Holy See does not have relations. The Holy See is the only European subject of international law that has diplomatic relations with the government of the Republic of China (Taiwan) as representing China, rather than the government of the People's Republic of China (see Holy See–Taiwan relations).

The British Foreign and Commonwealth Office speaks of Vatican City as the "capital" of the Holy See, although it compares the legal personality of the Holy See to that of the Crown in Christian monarchies and declares that the Holy See and the state of Vatican City are two international identities. It also distinguishes between the employees of the Holy See (2,750 working in the Roman Curia with another 333 working in the Holy See's diplomatic missions abroad) and the 1,909 employees of the Vatican City State. The British Ambassador to the Holy See uses more precise language, saying that the Holy See "is not the same as the Vatican City State. ... (It) is the universal government of the Catholic Church and operates from the Vatican City State." This agrees exactly with the expression used by the website of the United States Department of State, in giving information on both the Holy See and the Vatican City State: it too says that the Holy See "operates from the Vatican City State".

The Holy See is a member of various international organizations and groups including the International Atomic Energy Agency (IAEA), International Telecommunication Union, the Organization for Security and Co-operation in Europe (OSCE), the Organisation for the Prohibition of Chemical Weapons (OPCW) and the United Nations High Commissioner for Refugees (UNHCR). The Holy See is also a permanent observer in various international organizations, including the United Nations General Assembly, the Council of Europe, UNESCO (United Nations Educational, Scientific and Cultural Organization), the World Trade Organization (WTO), and the Food and Agriculture Organization (FAO).

Relationship with Vatican City and other territories

The Holy See participates as an observer to African Union, Arab League, Council of Europe, the Non-Aligned Movement (NAM), Organization of American States, International Organization for Migration and in the United Nations and its agencies FAO, ILO, UNCTAD, UNEP, UNESCO, UN-HABITAT, UNHCR, UNIDO, UNWTO, WFP, WHO, WIPO.  and as a full member in IAEA, OPCW, Organization for Security and Co-operation in Europe (OSCE).

Although the Holy See is closely associated with Vatican City, the independent territory over which the Holy See is sovereign, the two entities are separate and distinct. After the Italian seizure of the Papal States in 1870, the Holy See had no territorial sovereignty. In spite of some uncertainty among jurists as to whether it could continue to act as an independent personality in international matters, the Holy See continued in fact to exercise the right to send and receive diplomatic representatives, maintaining relations with states that included the major powers Russia, Prussia, and Austria-Hungary. Where, in accordance with the decision of the 1815 Congress of Vienna, the Nuncio was not only a member of the Diplomatic Corps but its dean, this arrangement continued to be accepted by the other ambassadors. In the course of the 59 years during which the Holy See held no territorial sovereignty, the number of states that had diplomatic relations with it, which had been reduced to 16, actually increased to 29.

The State of the Vatican City was created by the Lateran Treaty in 1929 to "ensure the absolute and visible independence of the Holy See" and "to guarantee to it indisputable sovereignty in international affairs." Archbishop Jean-Louis Tauran, the Holy See's former Secretary for Relations with States, said that Vatican City is a "minuscule support-state that guarantees the spiritual freedom of the pope with the minimum territory".

The Holy See, not Vatican City, maintains diplomatic relations with states. Foreign embassies are accredited to the Holy See, not to Vatican City, and it is the Holy See that establishes treaties and concordats with other sovereign entities. When necessary, the Holy See will enter a treaty on behalf of Vatican City.

Under the terms of the Lateran Treaty, the Holy See has extraterritorial authority over various sites in Rome and two Italian sites outside of Rome, including the Pontifical Palace at Castel Gandolfo. The same authority is extended under international law over the Apostolic Nunciature of the Holy See in a foreign country.

Military

Though, like various European powers, earlier popes recruited Swiss mercenaries as part of an army, the Pontifical Swiss Guard was founded by Pope Julius II on 22 January 1506 as the personal bodyguards of the pope and continues to fulfill that function. It is listed in the Annuario Pontificio under "Holy See", not under "State of Vatican City". At the end of 2005, the Guard had 134 members. Recruitment is arranged by a special agreement between the Holy See and Switzerland. All recruits must be Catholic, unmarried males with Swiss citizenship who have completed basic training with the Swiss Armed Forces with certificates of good conduct, be between the ages of 19 and 30, and be at least 175 cm (5 ft 9 in) in height. Members are armed with small arms and the traditional halberd (also called the Swiss voulge), and trained in bodyguarding tactics.

The police force within Vatican City, known as the Corps of Gendarmerie of Vatican City, belongs to the city state, not to the Holy See.

The Holy See signed the UN treaty on the Prohibition of Nuclear Weapons, a binding agreement for negotiations for the total elimination of nuclear weapons.

Coat of arms 

The main difference between the two coats of arms is that the arms of the Holy See have the gold key in bend and the silver key in bend sinister (as in the sede vacante coat of arms and in the external ornaments of the papal coats of arms of individual popes), while the reversed arrangement of the keys was chosen for the arms of the newly founded Vatican City State in 1929.

See also 
Ethnic enclave
Global organisation of the Catholic Church
Index of Vatican City-related articles
Patriarchate
Petitions to the Holy See
Pontifical academy
See of Constantinople
Sovereign Military Order of Malta

Notes

References

Further reading

External links 

The Holy See
The Holy See News Portal (News.va) 

Primacy of the Apostolic See
CIA World Factbook on Holy See
Between Venus and Mars, the Church of Rome Chooses Both—The Holy See's geopolitics analyzed in the light of the dominant doctrines
The Holy See in the course of time, from an Orthodox perspective
Inside the Vatican Documentary on National Geographic YouTube channel